The following Confederate Army units and commanders fought in the Battle of the Crater (July 30, 1864) of the American Civil War. The Union order of battle is listed separately.

Abbreviations used

Military Rank
 Gen = General
 MG = Major General
 BG = Brigadier General
 Col = Colonel
 Ltc = Lieutenant Colonel
 Maj = Major
 Cpt = Captain
 Lt = Lieutenant

Other
 (w) = wounded
 (mw) = mortally wounded
 (k) = killed in action
 (c) = captured

Army of Northern Virginia

Gen Robert E. Lee

III Corps

LTG A. P. Hill

Artillery
BG William N. Pendleton

Department of North Carolina And Southern Virginia
Gen P.G.T. Beauregard

Notes

References
 Kinard, Jeff.  The Battle of the Crater (Abilene, TX:  McWhiney Foundation Press), 1998.

See also

 Virginia in the American Civil War
 Petersburg National Battlefield

American Civil War orders of battle